Nigel Scott (born 19 December 1961) is a New Zealand former cricketer. He played sixteen first-class and ten List A matches for Auckland between 1980 and 1988.

See also
 List of Auckland representative cricketers

References

External links
 

1961 births
Living people
New Zealand cricketers
Auckland cricketers
Cricketers from Bristol